A list of notable politicians of the Alleanza Nazionale party, Italy:

A
Gianni Alemanno
Giuseppe Angeli
Roberta Angelilli

B
Mario Baldassarri
Sergio Berlato
Italo Bocchino
Giulia Bongiorno

C
Antonio Cicchetti

D
Elena Donazzan

F
Gianfranco Fini
Publio Fiori
Domenico Fisichella
Alessandro Foglietta

G
Maurizio Gasparri
Alberto Giorgetti

L
Ignazio La Russa
Mario Landolfi

M
Alfredo Mantica
Altero Matteoli
Giorgia Meloni
Roberto Menia
Cristiana Muscardini
Alessandra Mussolini

P
Giovanni Pace
Nicola Pasetto
Oreste Perri
Umberto Pirilli
Adriana Poli Bortone

R
Antonio Rastrelli
Andrea Ronchi

S
Daniela Santanché
Giuseppe Scopelliti
Edgardo Sogno

T
Giuseppe Tatarella
Salvatore Tatarella
Mirko Tremaglia

Alleanza